Navutoka is a football club from Tonga, currently playing in the Tonga Major League, the highest level of association football competition in Tonga.

History
The first record of Navutoka playing in the Tongan football league system is in 1975. They reached the second place out of eight participants. They returned not earlier than the 1983 season. From this time they were a regular participant in the Tonga Major League. In 1989 and 1994 they won the league. The 1994 win would be the last win for another club than Lotoha'apai United. From 1998 until 2008 they won all the titles. Navutoka have never played in the Oceania Club Championship because in the years that they became champions the competition was not held.

Current squad
Squad for the 2019 Tonga Major League

Honours
Tonga Major League:2
Winners 1989, 1994

References

Football clubs in Tonga